Liechtenstein competed at the 2020 Winter Youth Olympics in Lausanne, Switzerland from 9 to 22 January 2020.

Liechtenstein won its first ever Youth Olympics medal when bobsledder Quentin Sanzo won bronze in the boys' monobob event.

Medalists
Medals awarded to participants of mixed-NOC teams are represented in italics. These medals are not counted towards the individual NOC medal tally.

Alpine skiing

Girls

Bobsleigh

Cross-country skiing

Boys

Skeleton

See also
Liechtenstein at the 2020 Summer Olympics

References 

Nations at the 2020 Winter Youth Olympics

2020 in Liechtenstein sport
Liechtenstein at the Youth Olympics